Tangia is an urn-shaped terra cotta cooking vessel.  It is also the name of the stew cooked in the pot.  It is common in Marrakech, Morocco.

basically, it is prepared with lamb shank, one or more candied lemons, a few spices, garlic, and water. All in an amphora that is covered and placed in the embers or the oven.

See also
Tajine
 Bastilla
 Harira
 Tharid
 Taktouka
 Bissara

References

Arab cuisine
Cooking vessels
Moroccan cuisine